Hammersly-Strominger House is a historic home located at Newberry Township, York County, Pennsylvania. It was built in two phases.  The first section was built about 1790, and is a -story, log structure with a gable roof. A -story, gable-roofed, stone section was added in 1835.  It features a shed-roofed porch.

It was added to the National Register of Historic Places in 1978.

References

Houses on the National Register of Historic Places in Pennsylvania
Houses completed in 1835
Houses in York County, Pennsylvania
National Register of Historic Places in York County, Pennsylvania